The 2002 ConAgra Foods Hawaii Bowl was the inaugural Hawaii Bowl game and matched the hometown Hawaii Warriors with the Tulane Green Wave. Hawaii came into the game 10–3 and Tulane came into the game 7–5. The game was sponsored by ConAgra Foods, a packaged foods company.

Hawaii opened the scoring with a 1-yard Thero Mitchell touchdown, to lead the game 7–0. In the second quarter, Josh Galeai scored on a 2-yard touchdown run giving the Warriors a 14–0 lead. Seth Marler kicked field goals from 22 and 37 yards before the end of the first half to cut the lead to 14–6. In the third quarter, Lynaris Elpheage scored on a 60-yard punt return to cut the lead to 14–12. Tulane went for two but failed, and the score remained 14-12 Hawaii.

Later, Tulane quarterback J. P. Losman scored on a 1-yard quarterback sneak. He ran in the two-point conversion, giving Tulane a 20–14 lead. Mewelde Moore later scored on a 25-yard touchdown run for Tulane. Tulane went for two again, but were denied, leaving the score 26–14 Tulane. Shawn Withy-Allen, subbing for an injured Timmy Chang, threw a 57-yard touchdown pass to wide receiver Justin Colbert in the third quarter to cut the lead to 26–21.

Losman scored on a 3-yard rushing touchdown. He then threw a pass to Damarcus Davis for the two-point conversion and a 34–21 lead. Wide receiver Colbert caught a 31-yard touchdown pass from Withy-Allen to cut the lead to 34–28. On Hawaii's next drive, Withy-Allen was sacked in the end zone for a safety, making the final margin 36–28.

References

External links
 USA Today game summary

Hawaii Bowl
Hawaii Bowl
Hawaii Rainbow Warriors football bowl games
Tulane Green Wave football bowl games
2002 in sports in Hawaii
December 2002 sports events in the United States